Taedong County is a kun (county) in South P'yŏngan province, North Korea.

Administrative divisions
Taedong County is divided into 1 ŭp (town), 1 rodongjagu (workers' districts) and 21 ri (villages):

Notable people
 Hwang Sun-wŏn (1915–2000), was a Korean short story writer, novelist and poet

References

External links
  Map of Pyongan provinces
  Detailed map

Counties of South Pyongan